Goniodoris aspersa is a species of sea slug or nudibranch, a marine gastropod mollusc in the family Goniodorididae.

Distribution
This species was described from Waltair, Vizagapatam, Bay of Bengal, India.

References

Goniodorididae
Gastropods described in 1864